Leninsky Administrative Okrug is an okrug (territorial division) of the City of Murmansk in Murmansk Oblast, Russia. Population:

History
It was established for the first time by the Decree of the Presidium of the Supreme Soviet of the Russian SFSR of April 20, 1939 and abolished together with the other two city districts on June 2, 1948. All three city districts, including Leninsky, were restored on June 23, 1951, but on September 30, 1958 were again abolished. On June 10, 1957, two city districts were created in Murmansk, including Leninsky District. When the Charter of the Hero City of Murmansk was adopted on December 17, 1995, all city districts started to be referred to as administrative okrugs.

References

Notes

Sources



Murmansk
States and territories established in 1939
States and territories disestablished in 1948
States and territories established in 1951
States and territories disestablished in 1958
States and territories established in 1967